Kang Ji-young (born January 18, 1994), also known as Jiyoung or JY, is a South Korean singer and actress based in Japan. She is a member of the South Korean girl group Kara.

Life and career 
Kang Ji-young was born on January 18, 1994, in Paju, South Korea. She is the cousin of the K-pop singer NS Yoon-G.

She attended Bongilcheon Middle School and Muhak Women's High School, graduating from the latter in February 2012.

2008–2014: Kara 

Jiyoung joined the girl group Kara in 2008 along with member Hara, following the departure of former member Kim Sung-hee. She was 14 years old at the time, making her the youngest member of the group.

Jiyoung was the only Korean female singer to be featured on CDTV Japan's Favorite Female Artist Ranking for 2011, where she was ranked at #21.

On January 15, 2014, it was announced that she would leave the group once her contract expired in April 2014 to focus on her studies with acting and language skills in London. In 2022, she rejoined the group for their 15th anniversary promotions.

2014–present: Solo activities as actress and other works 
After leaving Kara, Jiyoung signed with the agency Sweet Power to resume her activities in Japan as an actress, using her name in kanji, 知英. She made her first appearance in the 19th Tokyo Girls Collection fashion show in the Saitama Super Arena on September 6.

Jiyoung's first work in Japan was the live-action of Hell Teacher Nube, where she played the heroine, Yukime.

In December 2015, Sony Music announced that Jiyoung would debut as a singer under the name of JY. Her first solo single was "The Last Farewell" (最後のサヨナラ, saigo no sayonara), for the OST for the Japan NTV drama Higanbana.

On March 18, 2016, she released her debut solo EP as JY, Radio, consisting of three tracks. Two of the three tracks were released with music videos. "Radio" was written by London-based songwriter and producer MNEK, while Darren Craig directed its music video. Radio peaked at #2 on the iTunes Pop Top Song Chart. It was marketed in the US and other parts of Asia in addition to South Korea and Japan.

In February 2022, it is reported that Kang has decided not to renew her contract with KeyEast.

On April 6, 2022, it was announced that Kang signed with ELRIS Entertainment.

In July 2022 Kang released Project solo Lucid Dream

Discography

Studio albums

Extended plays

Singles

As lead artist

As featured artist

Other appearances

Video albums

Filmography

Film

Musical theatre

Television

Drama

Web series

Radio shows

Bibliography

Endorsements

Awards

Footnotes

References

External links 

 JY official website 
 

1994 births
Kara (South Korean group) members
DSP Media artists
Living people
People from Paju
Japanese-language singers of South Korea
South Korean child singers
South Korean female idols
South Korean dance musicians
South Korean rhythm and blues singers
South Korean women pop singers
South Korean J-pop singers
South Korean expatriates in Japan
South Korean television actresses
South Korean television presenters
South Korean web series actresses
South Korean women television presenters
South Korean radio presenters
Sungkyunkwan University alumni
Kang Ji-young (JY)
21st-century South Korean actresses
21st-century South Korean singers
21st-century South Korean women singers
South Korean women radio presenters